Subal C. Kumbhakar is an Indian born American economist. He is a Distinguished Research Professor of Economics at Binghamton University. He was awarded Doctor Honoris Causa, 1997, Gothenburg University, Sweden. He is a fellow of Journal of Econometrics, distinguished author of Journal of Applied Econometrics, co-editor of the Social Science Citation Index journal Empirical Economics, coauthor of a highly cited book on Stochastic Frontier Analysis. He is associated with the University of Stavanger, Norway and Inland School of Business and Social Sciences, Lillehammer, Norway. He advises Oxera Consulting LLP Oxford, UK on regulatory performance measures. He is internationally known for his research on efficiency and productivity. His models on efficiency and productivity are used by researchers worldwide.

Academic career 
Subal received his Ph.D. in economics from the University of Southern California in 1986. His main area of research is on econometric estimation of efficiency and productivity using Stochastic Frontier Approach. He has formulated a variety of panel data models to measure efficiency, which are applied by researchers and practitioners all over the world. His recent works include estimating green productivity and environmental efficiency. He also researched on economics. His current research includes productivity measurement.

Subal is currently a co-editor of Empirical Economics. He has also been serving as a Board of Editors and/or associate editors of Journal of Productivity Analysis since 1998, Technological Forecasting and Social Change: An International Journal since 1991, Journal of Regulatory Economics since 2015, Macroeconomics and Finance in Emerging Market Economies since 2007, Applied Econometrics since 2016, Ecos de Economia: A Latin American Journal of Applied Economics since 2016.

Subal is a co-author of the books Stochastic Frontier Analysis (2000) with Knox Lovell, and A Practitioner's Guide to Stochastic Frontier Analysis (2015) with H-J Wang and A Horncastle, both published by the Cambridge University Press.

Academic history 
1986 Ph.D., Economics, University of Southern California
1983 Masters of Arts, Economics, University of Southern California, Los Angeles
1977 Masters of Arts, Economics, Calcutta University, Calcutta, India

Positions held 
2005–present, Distinguished Research Professor of Economics, Binghamton University, State University of New York
2001 - 2005, Professor, Economics Department, Binghamton University (State University of New York)
1986 - 2000, Assistant, Associate and Full Professor, Economics Department, University of Texas at Austin
1977 - 1981, Assistant Professor and Reader, Economics Department, University of Burdwan, Burdwan, India.

Honors 

Doctor Honoris Causa, Gothenburg University, Sweden, 1997
Fellow, Journal of Econometrics, 1998.
Distinguished author, Journal of applied econometrics, 2017.
Member/Opponent of Ph.D. Evaluation Committee (International): Athens University of Economics and Business (Greece), University of Western Australia (Perth), Swedish University of Agricultural Sciences (Umea, Sweden), Norwegian University of Life Sciences (As, Norway), Charles University (Czech Republic), Technical University of Dresden (Germany), University of Helsinki (Finland), University of Stavanger (Norway), Wageningen University (Netherlands), University of New England (Australia), Gothenburg University (Sweden), Norwegian School of Business Administration (Bergen, Norway), Agricultural University of Norway (As, Norway), Indian Statistical Institute (Calcutta, India), Burdwan University (West Bengal, India), Jawaharlal Nehru University (New Delhi, India).

Selected Published works

Books 
 Paperback version, 2003; Fudan Translation Series (Chinese translation ), 2008.

Journal special issue editor

Selected Journal Publications

References

External links 
Subal Kumbhakar at Google Scholar
https://meteor.springer.com/project/dashboard.jsf?id=552&tab=About
http://bingweb.binghamton.edu/~kkar/index.html
http://bingweb.binghamton.edu/~kkar/cv2_03.pdf

Year of birth missing (living people)
Living people